Cristina Hardekopf (born December 9, 1940), also spelled Christina, is a diver who was Argentina's flag bearer at the 1960 Summer Olympics in Rome. She was scheduled to compete in the Women's 3 metre springboard contest, but withdrew due to illness or an injury.

Hardekopf is the daughter of German gymnast Anita Bärwirth, who competed in the 1936 Summer Olympics in Berlin.

See also
Diving at the 1960 Summer Olympics
Diving at the 1960 Summer Olympics—Women's 3 metre springboard
Argentina at the 1960 Summer Olympics

References

External links 
 

1940 births
Living people
Argentine female divers
Olympic divers of Argentina
Divers at the 1960 Summer Olympics
20th-century Argentine women